Diphenylzinc is an organozinc compound. It is commonly used as the synthetic equivalent of a Ph− synthon. Solvent-free diphenylzinc exists as dimeric  molecules in the solid state.

Diphenylzinc is commercially available. It may be prepared by reaction of phenyllithium with zinc bromide:

2 PhLi + ZnBr2 → Ph2Zn + 2 LiBr

It may also be prepared by the reaction of phenylmagnesium bromide with zinc chloride or diphenylmercury with zinc metal.

References

Organozinc compounds
Phenyl compounds